Hyderabadi is a variety of Dakhini Urdu, spoken in areas of the former Hyderabad State, corresponding to the Indian state of Telangana, the Marathwada region of Maharashtra and the Kalyana-Karnataka region of Karnataka.

It is natively spoken by the Hyderabadi Muslims and their diaspora. It contains loan words from Indian languages like Marathi, Telugu, Kannada and foreign languages like Arabic, Turkic and Persian. Hyderabadi is considered to be a northern variety of Dakhini.

History

Distinctive features
Hyderabadi is mutually intelligible with most Hindi/Urdu speakers but has distinctive features from interaction with local Indian Languages such as Marathi, Telugu, Kannada.

Phonology 
The letter ق (qāf) is pronounced as an unvoiced velar fricative /x/ with the same pronunciation as خ (khe) whereas in Standard Hindustani dialects the ق is pronounced as a velar plosive /k/ with the same pronunciation as ک (kāf). For example, the word 'qabar' (grave) is pronounced as 'khabar' (news).

Lexical features 
Distinct vocabulary unique to Hyderabadis:

Āra'en آرئیں - (is) coming; "Ā rahe hain" "آرہے ہیں" in standard Urdu
Čindiyān kardiya چِندیاں کر دیا - Nailed it
Čupke to bī / čupkaič چُپکے تو بی / چُپکَیچ - No reason
Hona ہونا - to want, instead of "čāhna" چاہنا in Orthodox Urdu (instead of "mujhē woh čāhi'ē" "مجھے وہ چاہیے" in Orthodox Urdu, Hyderabadi Urdu would use "mērēku woh hona." "میرے کو وہ ہونا")
Hao ہَؤ - for yes, instead of "Hān" "ہاں".
Hallu ہلُّو - Slow
Haula ہَولا - foolish, crazy person
Hota ki nai ki ہوتا کی نئیں کی - May or may not happen
Jāndo جاندو - let it go
Jāra'un جارؤں - I am leaving
Jāra'en جارئیں - (is) going; جارہے ہیں "jā rahe hain" in standard Urdu
Kačča(i) (ی)کچا- wet; in standard Urdu, wet would be گیلا "gīla". کچا "kacha" in standard Urdu means "raw".
Kaīkū کئيکو - why; کیوں "kyūn" or کس لئے "kis li'ē" in standard Urdu.
Kaīkū ki کئيکو کی - wonder why, who knows why
Katey کَتے - it is often used when a person mentions something told by someone else. It could be translated as "it seems". Usage: "Kal unay bahar jaara katey" means "It seems he is going outside tomorrow".
 Kxayāli pulāo خیالی پُلاؤ - Wishful thinking
Kunjī کنجی - keys; in standard Urdu, keys would be chābī چابی.
Kya toh bī hora کیا تو بی ہو را - what the hell is happening
Lāiṭ liyo لائٹ لِیو - take it easy
Mērēku میرے کو - my, instead of "mujhe" مجھے or "mujhko" مجھکو in standard Urdu
Miyān میاں - fellow (i.e. "Chalo miyan "چلو میاں" means "Let's go, man.")
Nakko نکو - an alternate (and informal) negative, generally indicating "no", "no thanks" or "don't". It can be (and is often) used in place of نہیں "nahīn", نہ "nā" and مت "mat" (from traditional Urdu) are used where نکو "nakko" is inappropriate for the context or in polite situations.
 Parsūn پرسُوں - literally it means the day before yesterday or the day after tomorrow but it is widely used for any time in recent past.
Phugat پُھگٹ - for free
Poṭṭī پوٹی - derogatory term for girl
Poṭṭā پوٹا - derogatory term for boy
Paintābē پَینتابے - socks; in standard Urdu it would be مَوزے "mauzē".
Tumārē ku تمارے کو - you, instead of tumhen تمہیں or tumko تمکو in standard Urdu
Tērē ku تیرے کو (informal slang) - you, instead of tujhe or tujhko in standard Urdu
Uney اُنے - he/she, instead of woh in standard Urdu.
 Zyāda nakko kar زیادہ نکو کر - don't act over smart
 The word اِچ "ič" is often added after a noun or verb to express the confidence of the action. In standard Urdu, ہی "hī" would be used. For example: "Biryāni'ič lāraun mēn" "بریانی اِچ لا رَؤں میں". In standard Urdu this would be "Biryāni hī lā rahā hūn main" "بریانی ہی لا رہا ہوں میں".
 The Urdu word ہے "hai" (be) is often dropped. For example, Urdu "Mujhē mālūm hai" "مجھے معلوم ہے" (I know it) would be "Mērē ku mālum" "میرے کو معلُم".
 Aisich اَیسِچ - No reason/without any reason (casually) as in "ایسچ کرا" "I did it without any reason"

Peculiar features
The suffix "ān" is often used to mark plurality. The letter 'n' is an almost silent nasal stop. For example, Log لوگ (people) would become Logān لوگاں, Bāt بات (talk) would become Bātān باتاں, Ādmi آدمی (men) pronounced as Admi ادمی would become Admiyān ادمیاں, etc. in the Hyderabadi dialect.

While talking, many long a's (as in "father") are pronounced "uh" as in "hut." For example, instead of "ādmi" آدمی (man) or "rāsta" راستہ (path) in Orthodox Urdu, Hyderabadi would use "admi" ادمی and "rasta" رستہ. Similarly "bhūl" بھول (to forget), "ṭūṭ" ٹوٹ (to break) and "čūṛi'ān" چوڑیاں (bangles) is "bhul" بُھل, "ṭuṭ" ٹُٹ and "čuṛiyān" چُڑیاں in Hyderabadi.

Popularity and usage
In the early sixties, film star Mehmood popularized another dialect in Indian films, Dakhni slang, which originates from former Mysore State.

A very famous Guinness record holder drama /stage comedy written in Dakhani is Adrak Ke Punjey.
Many Urdu poets also write in the Hyderabadi dialect of Dakhani, including Pagal Adilabadi, Khamakha Hyderabadi and Nukko Hyderabadi (of Chicago, Illinois).

Hyderabadi gained sudden prominence and recognition in 2006 after the success of the comedy film The Angrez that adopted the dialect. The film's success sparked several other Hyderabadi dialect films including: Kal ka Nawaab, Hyderabad Nawaabs, Aadab Hyderabad, Gullu Dada, Gullu Dada returns, Berozgaar, Hungama In Dubai, Daawat-e-Ishq.

See also
 Bengluri Dakhni
 Dakhini
 Pagal Adilabadi - Famous Hyderabadi Urdu poet
 List of Urdu-language poets

References

Urdu in India
Dialects of Urdu
Languages of Telangana
Culture of Hyderabad, India